Peter Beaumont (born 2 January 1965) is a British rower. He competed in the men's coxed eight event at the 1988 Summer Olympics, and finished in fourth place. His son Jack is an Olympic silver medalist at the 2020 Olympic Games.

References

External links
 

1965 births
Living people
British male rowers
Olympic rowers of Great Britain
Rowers at the 1988 Summer Olympics
Sportspeople from Birmingham, West Midlands